Austin Ricci (born April 8, 1996) is a Canadian professional soccer player who plays as a forward for York United FC of the Canadian Premier League.

Early life
Ricci played youth soccer with Richmond Hill SC. In 2010, he joined Ajax SC.

Ricci played high school soccer for the St. Theresa of Lisieux Catholic High School Lions, winning gold at OFSAA in 2014, and being named MVP of the team for three consecutive seasons.

College career
In February 2014, he committed to Oakland University to play for the men's soccer team in the fall. He scored his first goal on September 12, 2014 against the Denver Pioneers. He won the Horizon League with the team in his freshman season in 2014. In 2015, he was named Horizon League Co-Offensive Player of the Year and a Horizon League First-Team All Star, and was named to the NSCAA All-Great Lakes Regional Second Team. In his junior season in 2016, he was named to the NSCAA All-Great Lakes Regional Third Team. In his senior season in 2017, he was named a Horizon League First-Team All-Star.

Club career
In 2014 and 2015, he appeared for Vaughan Azzurri in League1 Ontario. 

In 2016, he played for K-W United FC in the Premier Development League. He scored a hat trick in the season opener on May 17 against Toronto FC III.

He played for the Michigan Bucks in the Premier Development League in 2017 and 2018. In 2017, he won the Great Lakes Division with the team. On July 10, 2018, he scored four goals and added four assists in a 14-1 victory over the Derby City Rovers, a performance which earned him PDL Player of the Week honours.

He later returned to Vaughan Azzurri in 2018, scoring six goals in twelve appearances, across the regular season and playoffs, as Vaughan won the league title.

In December 2018, Ricci signed his first professional contract with Canadian Premier League side York 9 FC for the 2019 season. He made 11 appearances for the club in 2019 across all competitions, tallying one assist.

In February 2020, he went on trial with Valour FC, also in the Canadian Premier League, and had been set to sign a contract in March, when the COVID-19 pandemic hit, delaying the signing. In July 2020, he officially signed with the club. In his first season with the club, he made six appearances during the shortened season, drawing two earning two penalty kicks for the team. In November 2020, he re-signed with the club. On June 27, 2021, he scored his first professional goal in a match against Forge FC. His second goal gave his team a 1-0 victory over Forge FC on July 11. On July 19, he scored a brace to help Valour to a 3-0 victory over York United FC. He was named to the CPL Team of the Week three times in 2021. On August 22, 2021, he scored a brace against Atlético Ottawa in a Canadian Championship match, to help lead Valour to their first ever victory in the competition. He finished as the top goalscorer in the 2021 Canadian Championship domestic cup competition, winning the Golden Boot, with three goals. His season was cut short after he was injured in a collision with Forge goalkeeper Triston Henry during a match in September.

In March 2022, he went on trial with his former club York United FC (who had previously been York9 during his last stint). In April 2022, he officially signed with the club for the 2022 season. He joined on a one-year contract with club options through 2024. On May 11, he re-aggravated his knee injury against Atlético Ottawa in a Canadian Championship match, forcing him to undergo surgery, causing him to miss the remainder of the season. In October 2022, he re-signed with the club for the 2023 season.

Career statistics

References

External links

1996 births
Living people
Association football forwards
Canadian soccer players
Soccer people from Ontario
Sportspeople from Richmond Hill, Ontario
Canadian expatriate soccer players
Expatriate soccer players in the United States
Canadian expatriate sportspeople in the United States
Oakland Golden Grizzlies men's soccer players
K-W United FC players
Flint City Bucks players
York United FC players
Valour FC players
USL League Two players
League1 Ontario players
Canadian Premier League players
Vaughan Azzurri players